Literary Club is a Bulgarian literary e-magazine, established in 1998. The magazine publishes literature news and criticism. Throughout the years, the magazine has presented numerous competitions, such as:

2000 - Short story competition dedicated to the 120th anniversary of Bulgarian writer Yordan Yovkov's birth.
2001 - Short story competition dedicated to the 121st anniversary of Yordan Yovkov's birth.
2004 - Literary criticism competition, dedicated to the 120th anniversary of Dimo Kyorchev's birth.
2007 - Short story competition dedicated to the 70th anniversary of Yordan Yovkov's death.

In 2009, the Literary Club won the national prize Hristo G. Danov for contributions to Bulgarian literary culture in the category Electronic Publishing and New Technologies.

External links
 

1998 establishments in Bulgaria
Magazines published in Bulgaria
Bulgarian-language magazines
Magazines established in 1998
Literary magazines
Monthly magazines